The Wise Wife is a 1927 American silent comedy film directed by E. Mason Hopper and starring Phyllis Haver, Tom Moore and Jacqueline Logan.

The film's sets were designed by the art director Mitchell Leisen. The costumes were by Adrian.

Cast
 Phyllis Haver as Helen Blaisdell 
 Tom Moore as John Blaisdell 
 Fred Walton as Helen's father 
 Jacqueline Logan as Jenny Lou 
 Joseph Striker as Carter Fairfax 
 Robert Bolder as Jason, the Butler

References

Bibliography
 Goble, Alan. The Complete Index to Literary Sources in Film. Walter de Gruyter, 1999.

External links
 

1927 films
1927 comedy films
1920s English-language films
American silent feature films
Silent American comedy films
Films directed by E. Mason Hopper
American black-and-white films
Pathé Exchange films
1920s American films